Wilmington–Ucolta Road is a 100 kilometre major road connecting Port Augusta to Peterborough and beyond to Broken Hill, in South Australia. This name covers many consecutive streets and is not widely known to most drivers except, as the entire allocation is still best known as by the names of its constituent parts: Willowie Road, Petersburg Road, and its concurrency along RM Williams Way. This article will deal with the entire length of the corridor for sake of completion, as well to avoid confusion between declarations.

It forms a route connecting the Augusta and Barrier Highways through the Flinders Ranges, and forms the most direct path between Port Augusta in South Australia (and following destinations like Alice Springs, Darwin, Kalgoorlie, and Perth) and Dubbo (and following destinations like Moree, Tamworth, Orange, and Newcastle), and hence provides the most direct link between Port Augusta and Sydney.

Route
Willowie Road starts just outside Wilmington, off Horrocks Highway and progresses east along the northern stretches of the Clare Valley, and also through the Flinders Ranges. It passes through Orroroo, where it changes name to RM Williams Way, to Black Rock, where it changes name to Petersburg Road and continues through Peterborough to the small town of Ucolta, just off the intersection with the Barrier Highway.

Major intersections

See also

 Highways in Australia
 List of highways in South Australia

References

External links

Highways in Australia
Roads in South Australia